The American League of Professional Baseball Clubs, known simply as the American League (AL), is one of two leagues that make up Major League Baseball (MLB) in the United States and Canada. It developed from the Western League, a minor league based in the Great Lakes states, which eventually aspired to major league status. It is sometimes called the Junior Circuit because it claimed Major League status for the 1901 season, 25 years after the formation of the National League (the "Senior Circuit").

At the end of every season, the American League champion plays in the World Series against the National League champion; two seasons did not end in playing a World Series (1904, when the National League champion New York Giants refused to play their AL counterpart, and 1994, when a players' strike prevented the Series). Through 2022, American League teams have won 67 of the 118 World Series played since 1903, with 27 of those coming from the New York Yankees alone. The New York Yankees have won 40 American League titles, the most in the league's history, followed by the Philadelphia/Kansas City/Oakland Athletics (15) and the Boston Red Sox (14).

History

Originally a minor league known as the Western League, which existed from 1885 to 1899 with teams in mostly Great Lakes states, the league changed its name to the American League for the 1900 season and the next year developed into a second major league as a competitor to the older National League. This was prompted by the NL dropping four teams following the 1899 season after having absorbed its previous rival, the American Association, which disbanded in 1891 after ten seasons. 

In its early history of the late 1880s, the minor Western League struggled until 1894, when Ban Johnson became the president of the league. Johnson pushed the league to rise to major league status, after the name change to the American League was decided in a league meeting in Milwaukee, Wisconsin, at the former Republican Hotel. A historical marker is at the intersection of North Old World 3rd Street and West Kilbourn Avenue where the hotel once stood.

In March 1904, Johnson moved the league's headquarters from Chicago to New York.

Babe Ruth, noted as one of the most prolific hitters in Major League Baseball history, spent the majority of his career in the American League with the Boston Red Sox and the New York Yankees. From 1973 to 2022 The American League had one notable difference versus the rival National League, as it had the designated hitter rule. Under the rule, a team may use a batter in its lineup who is not in the field defensively, replacing the pitcher (usually, although in years past pitchers such as Babe Ruth and Mickey Lolich would have remained in the game rather than light-hitting infielders) in the batting order, compared to the old rule that made it mandatory for the pitcher to bat. In the last two decades, the season schedule has allowed occasional interleague play. In 1969, the AL (and NL) were divided into East and West divisions, with a postseason playoff series for the pennant and the right to play in the World Series.

Until the late 1970s, league umpires working behind home plate wore large, balloon-style chest protectors worn outside the shirt or coat, while their colleagues in the National League wore chest protectors inside the shirt or coat. In 1977, new umpires (including Steve Palermo) had to wear the inside chest protector, although those on staff wearing the outside protector could continue to do so. Most umpires made the switch to the inside protector, led by Don Denkinger in 1975 and Jim Evans the next year, although several did not, including Bill Haller, Lou DiMuro, Russ Goetz, George Maloney, Bill Kunkel and Jerry Neudecker, who became the last full-time MLB umpire to use the outside protector in 1985.

In 1994, the league, along with the National League, reorganized again, this time into three divisions (East, West, and Central) and added a third round to the playoffs in the form of the American League Division Series, with the best second-place team advancing to the playoffs as a wild-card team, in addition to the three divisional champions. In 1998, the newly franchised Tampa Bay Devil Rays joined the league, and the Arizona Diamondbacks joined the National League: i.e., each league each added a fifteenth team. An odd number of teams per league meant that at least one team in each league would have to be idle on any given day, or alternatively, that odd team out would have had to play an interleague game against its counterpart in the other league. The initial plan was to have three five-team divisions per league with inter-league play year-round—possibly as many as 30 interleague games per team each year.

For various reasons, it soon seemed more practical to have an even number of teams in both leagues. The Milwaukee Brewers agreed to change leagues to become the National League's 16th team, moving from the AL Central to the NL Central. At the same time, the Detroit Tigers were moved from the AL East to the AL Central, making room for the Devil Rays in the East. Even after expansion, the American League then continued with 14 teams. This situation changed again in 2013 when the Houston Astros moved from the National League Central division to the American League West. The Astros had been in the NL for 51 years since beginning as an expansion team in 1962. Since their move, both leagues now consist of 15 teams.

Permanent interleague play
For the first 96 years, American League teams faced their National League counterparts only in exhibition games or in the World Series. Beginning in 1997, interleague games have been played during the regular season and count in the standings. As part of the agreement instituting interleague play, the designated-hitter rule was used only in games where the American League team is the home team, until the 2022 season, when the universal DH rule was implemented. 
In 2023, American League teams are playing 46 regular season interleague games against all 15 National League teams, 23 at home and 23 on the road.

Teams

Charter franchises
There were eight charter teams in 1901, the league's first year as a major league, and
the next year the original Milwaukee Brewers moved to St. Louis to become the St. Louis Browns, and the year after the New York Highlanders replaced the disbanded original Baltimore Orioles. Those eight franchises constituted the league for 52 seasons until the Browns moved to Baltimore and took up the Orioles name. The eight original teams and their counterparts in the "Classic Eight" were:

Original Baltimore Orioles (not to be confused with the current Baltimore Orioles, see Milwaukee Brewers) folded after the 1902 season, and was replaced by, the New York team that began play in 1903. The New York franchise was nicknamed "Highlanders, " "Americans" and "Yankees" until the latter became official in 1913.
Boston Americans (became the Boston Red Sox in 1908)
Chicago White Stockings (name shortened to White Sox in 1904)
Cleveland Blues (became the Cleveland Indians in 1915 and the Cleveland Guardians in 2022)
Detroit Tigers (name and locale unchanged from 1894 forward)
Original Milwaukee Brewers (became the St. Louis Browns in 1902 and the new Baltimore Orioles in 1954)
Philadelphia Athletics (became the Kansas City Athletics in 1955 and the Oakland Athletics in 1968)
Original Washington Senators (became the Minnesota Twins in 1961)

Expansion, renaming, and relocation summary

1902: Original Milwaukee Brewers moved to St. Louis, renamed St. Louis Browns
1902: Cleveland Bluebirds/Blues players attempted to adopt the nickname Cleveland Bronchos, which failed to catch on
1903: New York Highlanders replaced original Baltimore Orioles; dubbed "Highlanders" by press after their field, Hilltop Park, and "Yankees" as a alternate form of "Americans"
1903: Chicago White Stockings officially renamed Chicago White Sox
1903: Cleveland Blues/Bronchos renamed Cleveland Naps via newspaper poll, after star Nap Lajoie
1905: Washington Senators renamed Washington Nationals; Senators name continued to be used by media
1908: Boston Americans (informal nickname) formally named Boston Red Sox
1913: New York Highlanders nickname dropped in favor of already-established alternative, New York Yankees
1915: Cleveland Naps renamed Cleveland Indians
1954: St. Louis Browns move to Baltimore, renamed Baltimore Orioles
1955: Philadelphia Athletics move to Kansas City
1957: Washington Nationals/Senators formally renamed Washington Senators
1961: Washington Senators move to Minneapolis-St. Paul, renamed Minnesota Twins
1961: Los Angeles Angels and new Washington Senators enfranchised.
1965: Los Angeles Angels renamed California Angels in late-season on September 2, 1965. For the following season, the Angels moved within the Los Angeles metropolitan area from the city of Los Angeles to the Orange County suburb of Anaheim.
1968: Kansas City Athletics move to Oakland
1969: Kansas City Royals and Seattle Pilots enfranchised.
1970: Seattle Pilots move to Milwaukee, renamed Milwaukee Brewers. (Four years earlier, in 1966, the National League's Milwaukee Braves had moved to Atlanta.)
1972: Washington Senators move to Dallas, renamed Texas Rangers
1973: Oakland Athletics renamed Oakland A's
1977: Seattle Mariners and Toronto Blue Jays enfranchised
1980: Oakland A's officially renamed Oakland Athletics
1997: California Angels renamed Anaheim Angels. The change came more than 30 years after the team's move to Anaheim.
1998: Tampa Bay Devil Rays, representing Tampa-St. Petersburg, enfranchised
1998: Milwaukee Brewers transfer from the American League to the National League. (See above.)
2005: Anaheim Angels renamed Los Angeles Angels of Anaheim
2008: Tampa Bay Devil Rays renamed Tampa Bay Rays
2013: Houston Astros moved from the National League.
2016: Los Angeles Angels of Anaheim renamed Los Angeles Angels
2022: Cleveland Indians renamed Cleveland Guardians

Current teams

American League East

Baltimore Orioles enfranchised 1901 as the Milwaukee Brewers, moved to St. Louis (1902) and to Baltimore (1954)
Boston Red Sox enfranchised 1901, nicknamed the Americans (adopted name Red Sox in 1908)
New York Yankees enfranchised 1901 as Baltimore Orioles, moved to New York (1903) and nicknamed the Highlanders ("Highlanders" dropped out of use after move to the Polo Grounds in 1913; officially adopted alternate nickname Yanks/Yankees by 1923)
Tampa Bay Rays enfranchised 1998 as the Tampa Bay Devil Rays (team name changed in 2008)
Toronto Blue Jays enfranchised 1977

American League Central

Chicago White Sox enfranchised 1894 as the Sioux City Cornhuskers, moved to St. Paul (1895) and to Chicago (1900)
Cleveland Guardians enfranchised 1894 as the Grand Rapids Rustlers, moved to Cleveland (1900)
Detroit Tigers enfranchised 1894
Kansas City Royals enfranchised 1969
Minnesota Twins enfranchised 1894 as the Kansas City Blues, moved to Washington (1901), and to Minneapolis-St. Paul (1961)

American League West

Houston Astros enfranchised 1962 in National League as the Houston Colt .45s (team changed name to Astros in 1965), transferred to American League (2013)
Los Angeles Angels enfranchised 1961 as the Los Angeles Angels, then as the California Angels after moving to Anaheim (1966), then the Anaheim Angels (1997), then the Los Angeles Angels of Anaheim (2005).  This last remains the legal name of the franchise, but in actual practice, the team is known as the Los Angeles Angels.
Oakland Athletics enfranchised 1901 in Philadelphia, moved to Kansas City (1955) and to Oakland (1968)
Seattle Mariners enfranchised 1977
Texas Rangers enfranchised 1961 as the Washington Senators, moved to Arlington, Texas (1972)

Presidents

Following the 1999 season, the American and National Leagues were merged with Major League Baseball, and the leagues ceased to exist as business entities. The position of the American League President and National League President became honorary.

See also
List of American League pennant winners
American League Championship Series (ALCS)
American League Division Series (ALDS)
List of American League Wild Card winners

Notes

References

Sources
The National League Story, Lee Allen, Putnam, 1961.
The American League Story, Lee Allen, Putnam, 1962.
The Baseball Encyclopedia, published by MacMillan, 1968 and later.

 

Sports leagues established in 1901
1901 establishments in the United States
Professional sports leagues in the United States